Lis (Library of Iterative Solvers for linear systems, pronounced [lis]) is a scalable parallel software library for solving discretized linear equations and eigenvalue problems that mainly arise in the numerical solution of partial differential equations by using iterative methods. Although it is designed for parallel computers, the library can be used without being conscious of parallel processing.

Features 
Lis provides facilities for:
 Automatic program configuration
 NUMA aware hybrid implementation with MPI and OpenMP
 Exchangeable dense and sparse matrix storage formats
 Basic linear algebra operations for dense and sparse matrices
 Parallel iterative methods for linear equations and eigenvalue problems
 Parallel preconditioners for iterative methods
 Quadruple precision floating point operations
 Performance analysis
 Command-line interface to solvers and benchmarks

Example 
A C program to solve the linear equation  is written as follows:
#include <stdio.h>
#include "lis_config.h"
#include "lis.h"

LIS_INT main(LIS_INT argc, char* argv[])
{
  LIS_MATRIX  A;
  LIS_VECTOR  b, x;
  LIS_SOLVER  solver;
  LIS_INT     iter;
  double      time;

  lis_initialize(&argc, &argv);

  lis_matrix_create(LIS_COMM_WORLD, &A);
  lis_vector_create(LIS_COMM_WORLD, &b);
  lis_vector_create(LIS_COMM_WORLD, &x);

  lis_input_matrix(A, argv[1]);
  lis_input_vector(b, argv[2]);
  lis_vector_duplicate(A, &x);

  lis_solver_create(&solver);
  lis_solver_set_optionC(solver);
  lis_solve(A, b, x, solver);

  lis_solver_get_iter(solver, &iter);
  lis_solver_get_time(solver, &time);
  printf("number of iterations = %d\n", iter);
  printf("elapsed time = %e\n", time);

  lis_output_vector(x, LIS_FMT_MM, argv[3]);

  lis_solver_destroy(solver);
  lis_matrix_destroy(A);
  lis_vector_destroy(b);
  lis_vector_destroy(x);

  lis_finalize();

  return 0;
}

System requirements 
The installation of Lis requires a C compiler. The Fortran interface requires a Fortran compiler, and the algebraic multigrid preconditioner requires a Fortran 90 compiler. 
For parallel computing environments, an OpenMP or MPI library is required. Both the Matrix Market and Harwell-Boeing formats are supported to import and export user data.

Packages that use Lis 
 Gerris
 OpenModelica
 OpenGeoSys
 SICOPOLIS
 STOMP
 Diablo
 Kiva
 Notus
 Solis
 GeMA
 openCFS
 numgeo
 freeCappuccino
 Andromeda
 Yelmo

See also 

 List of numerical libraries
 Conjugate gradient method
 Biconjugate gradient stabilized method (BiCGSTAB)
 Generalized minimal residual method (GMRES)
 Eigenvalue algorithm
 Lanczos algorithm
 Arnoldi iteration
 Krylov subspace
 Multigrid method

References

External links 
 
 Development repository on GitHub
 Prof. Jack Dongarra's freely available linear algebra software page
 Netlib repository (Courtesy of Netlib Project)

 Fedora packages (Courtesy of Fedora Project)
 Gentoo packages (Courtesy of Gentoo Linux Project)
 AUR packages (Courtesy of Arch Linux Community)
 FreeBSD packages (Courtesy of FreeBSD Project)
 Packages for macOS (Homebrew) (Courtesy of Homebrew Project)
 Packages for macOS (MacPorts) (Courtesy of MacPorts Project)
 Packages for Windows (Courtesy of WHPC Project)
 Packages for Mingw-w64 (Courtesy of Mingw-w64 Project)
 Spack packages (Courtesy of Lawrence Livermore National Laboratory)

Numerical libraries
Numerical linear algebra
Scientific simulation software
C (programming language) libraries
Fortran libraries
Free simulation software
Free software programmed in C
Free software programmed in Fortran